Kahi Unkahi (meaning Spoken unspoken) is a 2012 Pakistani telenovela broadcast on Hum TV every Tuesday. Its first episode was aired on 6 November 2012. Written by Nadia Akhtar and directed by Asim Ali, Kahi Unkahi starred by Ayeza Khan, Shehryar Munawar Siddiqui and Urwa Hocane in the lead roles. The teledrama aired its last episode on 9 April 2013.

Kahi Unkahi  was also broadcast in India. It premiered on the channel, Zindagi, on 13 August 2014. The show was also selected to air on Hum Europe premiering 26 December 2019 and aired every Monday to Thursday 09:00pm GMT.

Plot

Kamaal Nizami is a haughty and arrogant wealthy businessman who believes that relations are to be made in equal class only. His wife, Saira has an equally opposite opinion from him, as she thinks that all humans are equal and hence everyone should be treated equally. Their elder son Ansar is much like his father in beliefs and mannerisms, but his young brother and Kamaal and Saira's younger son, Sherry is too close to his mother and often indulges in playing with the kids of household servants, thinking that all kids are like him. He befriends Zoya, who happens to be the only daughter of his driver Bashir Ahmed and affectionately refers to her as ‘Zoyi’. This fact is not looked upon favorably by Kamaal, as he wants Sherry to make friends among rich and renowned families.

Zoya, though comes from a poor background, is an industrious, friendly girl who wins Saira's heart by her dedication towards academics, and as a result, the lady gets her admission done in Sherry's school, where mostly children from rich families come. No matter how much Kamaal feels furious, this doesn’t stops Sherry from playing with Zoya and even exchanging lunchbox with her.

Parvez and his wife Nyla, family friends of Kamaal, offend Saira's decision of getting Zoya admitted to a high-class school. Anam, their daughter, develops envy towards Zoya as she scores higher than her in academics and wins Student of the Year trophy every year.

Things take a turn during Sherry's birthday party, where Zoya is humiliated by Anam and Zeeshan, her brother, as both call her a ‘servant’s kid’ and comment that she is not worthy of attending such parties of wealthy families. Parvez and Nyla support their children saying that Kamaal and Saira should not have invited Zoya to the party, no matter if Sherry likes spending time with her. This incident takes a toll on Kamaal's mind, and as a result, he decides to send Sherry abroad for further studies so that he can be away from Zoya and develop some upper-class mannerisms.

Few years later, a grown up Sherry returns for his brother's wedding functions and there is a fun time in the household. Kamaal informs Bashir about Sherry's return, saying that he should refrain from sending Zoya to their house till Ansar is married. Unknown to the family, Zoya is bothered by Ansar's behavior, as he often holds her hand in alone, or stops her way, which makes her dislike him and his habits.

During night time, Sherry happens to meet Zoya when they’re in the lawn area and collide with each other, as he stops her from falling, and seeing this, Kamaal gets agitated, confronting Sherry about the incident. Though Sherry assures him that he has nothing to do with Zoya and that they accidentally came across each other, he can’t stop from thinking about her again and again.

On the other hand, a grown up Anam is still arrogant and spoilt and also Kamaal's favorite. She instantly develops a liking for Sherry when she sees his photo and quickly befriends him when he comes at Kamaal's office. Sherry has almost forgotten all the moments that he used to spend at servant's quarter or playing with Zoya, but he feels himself being drawn towards her.

Zoya's college friend Aiman's brother, Shahzeb shows interest in marrying Zoya due to her kind nature, and he even invites her through Aiman at their place for dinner. Anam too is invited there, and is shocked to realize that Zoya is the same girl for whom Shahzeb rejected to marry her. She then indirectly insults Zoya by asking her about her family background in front of everyone, and on knowing about her father being a driver, Shahzeb's mother straightly announces that she cannot allow a servant's daughter to become Shahzeb's wife, although he still has interest in Zoya.

During wedding functions, Anam leaves no chance of humiliating or insulting Zoya, seeing which Sherry feels sorry for her. Ansar marries Mariam, following which Anam persuades Sherry to believe that he is in love with her and thus, being confused about his own feelings, he proposes to her. Anam declares this proposal to her parents, compelling them to go to Kamaal's place and talk about their wedding.

However, seeing Anam in such a hurry and her behavior towards poor helpless and needy people, Sherry is forced to think about his relationship with her again. He begins developing a soft-corner for Zoya on learning about her friendly and helping nature, and invites her to his birthday party which is actually organized by Anam. Seeing Zoya with him in the party, Anam blasts out at her angrily, which makes Sherry defend her, admitting that Zoya is a good friend to him and since the birthday party is for him, it is his right to invite all his close friends. Zeeshan misbehaves with Zoya at the party, when Sherry comes to her rescue and there's a fight between both guys, seeing which Zoya gets tense and this makes Anam sadistically happy.

On the other hand, Saira and Mariam are taken aback by Sherry's proposal to Anam, as they assume that he never showed any interest in her and Mariam even senses that he loves Zoya, but remains silent. She rather discusses this matter with Ansar, who warns her not to speak anything in front of Kamaal. Saira, though dislikes Anam because of her arrogance and attitudes, doesn’t dares to speak anything in front of her husband.

Kamaal is too elated with the fact that Sherry has proposed to Anam, and gets started with the preparations of their engagement. But during the engagement evening, Sherry denies to get engaged with Anam, saying that he was too confused while making a decision, which shocks everyone. He wastes no time in proposing to Zoya, who says that she would need some time to think about it.

A disheartened Anam & Kamaal decide to create differences between Sherry and Zoya knowing about his proposal. Anam calls Zoya at Shahzeb's place through Ayeza, her best friend and Shahzeb's younger sister, saying that he is not feeling well and no one is at home to look after him. The next moment, she calls Sherry, saying that Zoya is having an affair with Shahzeb without anyone's knowledge. This evil plan works and Sherry is heartbroken to see Zoya with Shahzeb alone at his home.

After seeing his daughter being humiliated by Kamaal in front of everyone, Bashir decides to leave for his village with her so that they can spend their life with respect at least. Assuming it the right time to gain Sherry's love again, Anam tries to talk to him, to spend time with him, but he is too hurt by Zoya's betrayal to talk to anyone, and rather remains alone all the time. Her anger deepens to such an extent that she faces an accident by rash-driving. Shahzeb gets to know about Anam's plan through Ayeza and even scolds her for being a part of this disgusting plan. He calls Sherry to tell him everything but his all efforts go in vain as Sherry doesn't believe him.

There, Ansar declares to Mariam that he has been having an affair with his secretary Seema (Nida Khan), sensing that she would disclose about their affair to his wife if he doesn’t marry her. He assumes that Mariam would be mad at him and speak out everything to Saira and Kamaal, but to his surprise, she visits at Seema's place and talks to her peacefully, apologizing for whatever Ansar did with her. This incident brings a change in Ansar, and he says to Mariam that there's a feeling of guilt & anxiousness in his heart, to which she replies that he might have knowingly or unknowingly hurt someone innocent because of which he has such feelings.

Realizing his wrongdoings towards Sherry and Zoya, he decides to tell the truth to Sherry, who has finally declared his decision of not marrying Anam and rather decides to leave Pakistan forever to settle in London against his parents' wish. On reaching at the airport, Ansar discloses the truth to his brother, which extremely disappoints Sherry. He returns to confront his father at his office and then at Parvez's home to talk to Anam about her disgusting plan, which heightens her anger and she goes in a state of depression. Kamaal is astonished to learn that Sherry is heading off to Zoya's village to get her apology and marry her. After an argument with his father, he leaves the home, much to Saira's sadness.

Zeeshan is raged to see his sister in depression, and sets out to find Sherry. There Mariam is delighted to learn about her pregnancy, and waits for Ansar to come home so that she could give this news to him face-to-face. Zeeshan comes at Kamaal's home, and finding Ansar step out of his car, he threatens him to send Sherry to apologize to Anam, but Ansar suggests him to solve the matter peacefully rather than by arguing unnecessarily. Enraged, Zeeshan shoots Ansar to death, later on being flabbergasted at his own act.

Kamaal and his family is deeply moved after Ansar's death, and Sherry, being not in contact with his family in any way, remains unknown of his brother's death and reaches at Zoya's place to apologize to Bashir and her. He is shocked to learn that Bashir has fixed Zoya's marriage with her paternal cousin Liyaqat, who is a typical chauvinist.

There Zeeshan is arrested by the police, after which Parvez suffers a heart-attack and is admitted to hospital. Kamaal and Saira miss Sherry even more after Ansar's death. On the other hand, Liyaqat learns about Sherry's feelings for Zoya and Bashir learns about his daughter's feelings for Sherry. Liyaqat confronts Sherry angrily, after which the entire matter comes in front of the villagers and hence the final decision is left to be taken by the Panchayat. After listening to Sherry's innocent wish of marrying Zoya, the Panchayat asks him to bring his parents to the village within seven days for asking her hand in marriage or else she would be married off to Liyaqat.

With the hope to take help from Ansar and Mariam, Sherry reaches back at his home, only to find his deeply broken parents who inform him about Ansar's death, hearing which he is too shocked to speak anything. He talks to Mariam, giving condolence to her and telling her about whatever happened at Zoya's village. Seeing his son and daughter-in-law being helpful towards each other, Kamaal decides to get Mariam married to Sherry so that Ansar's child could remain in their family.

Anam is distressed to see her father being in a critical condition and brother being behind bars. Nyla blames her for all this mess, in reply of which Anam confesses that her arrogance and attitude is a result of her bringing up. Nyla realizes her mistake in the teachings which she gave to her children. Anam goes to meet Zeeshan in jail where he asks her to talk to Kamaal for his bail as he will agree to her plea since he likes her. Anam argues with him on this matter when he says that she has become too selfish to even help her own brother. He confesses that he didn’t mean to shoot Ansar but whatever happened was an accident.

When Sherry comes to his father to talk about Zoya, Kamaal, before listening to him, pleads him to marry Mariam for the sake of Ansar's child. Seeing him in a helpless state and asking his son for something with much pleading, Sherry unwillingly agrees to his wish. Upon knowing this, Mariam is astonished, since she knew about Sherry being in love with Zoya and asks Kamaal to get them married instead of forcing Sherry into such a relationship where neither he nor Mariam would remain happy. She further says that she has always looked upon Sherry as a little brother and also that she would be like a daughter to Kamaal and Saira, thus living with them forever with Ansar's child.

On the other hand, a dejected Anam sadly pleads to a road-beggar to pray for all her problems being solved soon, since she has heard that God listens to the prayers of needy and helpless very soon. The beggar replies to her that the Almighty listens to everyone's prayers only if we pray with a pure heart. This reply brings a change in Anam and she begins realizing her impolite behavior all this while towards such helpless and needy people.

Saira senses that Sherry is not happy with the idea of marrying Mariam and she tries to talk to him, when Kamaal comes to them and surprises them by agreeing to get Sherry and Zoya married. A delighted Sherry then heads off to Zoya's village along with his family, and receiving this news, both Bashir and Zoya are elated.

A week later, Zoya is shown serving tea to everyone as Kamaal praises her hand-made tea and all are happy, just when Nyla and Anam reach there, pleading Kamaal to release Zeeshan from being punished. Kamaal gives to Mariam, the right of taking decision in this regard since she is Ansar's wife. She is about to leave from there when Zoya stops her and says that one can never bring back the dead and forgiving someone is the greatest gift anyone can give. Mariam agrees to get Zeeshan out of jail upon hearing this, after which Anam apologizes to Zoya and Sherry for her rude and ill-mannered behavior towards both, especially Zoya.

Sherry feels happy to have a life-partner like her, while Kamaal is proud on Zoya as he hugs her lovingly and the show ends on a happy note.

Cast 
 Ayeza Khan as Zoya
 Sheheryar Munawar as Sheheryar a.k.a. Sherry
 Urwa Hocane as Anam 
 Usman Peerzada as Kamal
 Irsa Ghazal as Saira
 Hasan Ahmed as Ansar
 Zhalay Sarhadi as Mariam
 Khalid Anam as Parvez
 Imran Aslam as Shahzeb
 Seemi Pasha as Parvez's wife 
 Tipu Sharif as Zeeshan
 Mansoor Sikandar
 Rashid Mehmood as Bashir
 Hina Javed as Zoya's college friend

References

External links 
 

Hum TV original programming
2012 Pakistani television series debuts
Urdu-language telenovelas
Pakistani telenovelas
Zee Zindagi original programming